Vasile Ilcă (born 1960) is a former Romanian rugby union player who played as hooker.

Career
Between 1981 and 1994, Ilcă played the Divizia Nationala for CS Universitatea Cluj-Napoca. He was called up for the Romania squad for the 1987 Rugby World Cup, where he only played the match against France in Wellington on 28 May 1987, which was his only cap.

References

External links

1960 births
Living people
Romanian rugby union players
Romania international rugby union players
Rugby union hookers